Nacala, also known as Cidade de Nacala or Nacala-Porto is a city on the northern coast of Mozambique. Located in the southwestern indentation of inner Fernao Veloso Bay, it is the deepest natural port on the east coast of Africa. Nacala serves as the terminal for the Nacala railway, a rail line to the landlocked Malawi. South of Nacala is Mozambique Island, at one time the capital of Mozambique and now a World Heritage site.

History
Nacala was founded as a little town and developed as a deep waters port and an industrial, agricultural and exporting centre during the last period of the Portuguese rule of the territory which ended in the mid-1970s. Among its major industries were cement, sisal and cashew. Other important employers were the seaport, its small modern hospital, and services (banking, insurance and administration).

Industry 

Nacala is site of one of three cement works in Mozambique.

Transport 

Nacala is the terminal of the Nacala railway that connects to the Central East African Railway (CEAR) of Malawi.  The railway system was managed by the Railroad Development Corporation until September 2008 when it was sold to a group of Mozambican investors.

It is the location of the deep water port of Port of Nacala. A coal terminal, operated by the Port of Nacala, is located in the town of Nacala-a-Velha on the opposite side of the bay from Nacala.

Nacala Airport is a former airbase that has been converted into an international airport.

Demographics

Climate

Miscellaneous 

The town is also known for its beaches and scuba diving.

Namesake 

There is another town in Mozambique called Nacala, the port city being called Cidade de Nacala.

See also 
 Fernao Veloso Bay
 Transport in Mozambique
 Railway stations in Mozambique
 Nacala Logistics Corridor

References

External links 
 Port of Nacala information
 Nacala development corridor
 CEAR linkage
  Accommodation and Scuba Diving on the east side of the bay

Populated places in Nampula Province